A disco ball is a rotating spherical object covered by many mirrored facets, usually illuminated by spotlights to create a complex display.

Disco ball or Disco Ball may also refer to:
 "Disco Ball" (song), 2013 song by Sharon Needles
 Disco Ball, a performer on the first season of The Masked Dancer

See also
 Disco Bill, a 1977 studio album by Bill Cosby